Kahil Dotay is an American business manager, producer, locations manager, director, and actor.

Dotay graduated with honors from the University of Florida attaining a B.S. B.A. He runs several business but is mostly known publicly for his career in show business. He was first widely known for his role as young Richard Dreyfuss in the film Courage & Stupidity. Dotay has appeared in more than sixty film productions. He was nominated for his performance in the movie Sarah and won best actor for his performance in the movie Full Spectrum .  He co-starred as a detective in the HBO original series, The Wire, during its third season and played the character Adam in the HBO original series, Washingtonienne.

Mr. Dotay is currently running a robotics company and producing films for the company INTEGfilms, LLC and freelancing as Location Manager and Scout in Virginia and Washington, DC.

In 2007, his script, "Frank & Flo" won first place in the "LA Shorts Fest". Despite the story taking place in Las Vegas, the resulting film was shot around Midlothian, VA and Richmond, VA in mid-2009.

In 2011, he played Elmer Irey in the major motion picture J. Edgar, directed by Clint Eastwood. In 2013, he played Neco in the award-winning suspense/horror film titled, "Neco's Basement". In January 2015, he wrapped production on the feature film entitled, "Vampires in Virginia". In that same year he participated in several projects, including "Putting up with it", which was popular in film festivals.  In 2016, he wrapped production on the feature entitled, "Sure Thing" where he worked on both sides of the camera. In 2017 he served as location manager and locations scout for the film, "Burning Sands". In 2018, he served as locations manager and line producer for several commercials and films. In 2019, he co-starred in the feature film entitled, "Dirty Money" and also served as their locations manager. In early 2020, he co-starred in a film entitled, "Dead Birds" that wrapped just before the Covid-19 pandemic struck the USA. He is currently in preproduction on two documentaries, and one pilot.

References

External links

Dotay's Official resume
Kahil Dotay's Official Website

American male film actors
American male screenwriters
Screenwriters from California
American male television actors
Living people
University of Florida alumni
American film producers
Film directors from California
Film producers from California
Year of birth missing (living people)